The Aurora Prize for Awakening Humanity is an international humanitarian award recognizing individuals for humanitarian work. It is awarded on behalf of the survivors of the Armenian genocide.

The Aurora Prize ceremonies have taken place since April 24, 2016. The laureate of the prize receives $1,000,000.

History
The Aurora Humanitarian Initiative was founded by Noubar Afeyan, Vartan Gregorian, and Ruben Vardanyan. Tom Catena is inaugural chair of the Aurora Humanitarian Initiative.

The Aurora Prize for Awakening Humanity is one of the projects of the Aurora Humanitarian Initiative. It was officially announced at 100 LIVES launch event in New York on March 10, 2015. The creation of the Aurora Prize was inspired by many stories of the rescue of Armenians during the Armenian genocide.

The prize is named after Aurora Mardiganian, a survivor of the Armenian genocide and the author of the book Ravished Armenia.

The Aurora Humanitarian Index is an international opinion poll that measures attitudes about humanitarian issues and the impact of humanitarian intervention.

The inaugural 2016 Aurora Dialogues were held on April 23, 2016, in Matenadaran, Yerevan. Participants included Hina Jilani, Shirin Ebadi and Gareth Evans. 2017 Aurora Dialogues took place on May 27–28 in Armenia and on December 4–5 in Berlin, Germany. In 2018, Aurora Dialogues were held in New York (in March and September), Moscow, Yerevan and Berlin. 2019 Aurora Dialogues took place in Armenia on October 17–21, 2019, during the inaugural Aurora Forum. Due to the outbreak of COVID-19, the Aurora Dialogues were online in 2020. Some of the Aurora Dialogues events were online in 2021.

Aurora Prize 
Nominations are solicited from humanitarian organizations and the public. The members of the Expert Panel assess all eligible nominations according to the Aurora Prize selection criteria to narrow the overall list to 20-25 nominees for the Selection Committee's attention. This panel is composed of humanitarian professionals and leaders of humanitarian organizations. The selection of finalists and the Aurora Prize laureate is made by the independent Aurora Prize Selection Committee.

2016 Aurora Prize

Selection Committee
Inaugural Selection Committee of the prize included the late Nobel Prize laureate Elie Wiesel, as well as Óscar Arias, Shirin Ebadi and Leymah Gbowee, former president of Ireland Mary Robinson, human rights activist Hina Jilani, former Australian foreign minister and president emeritus of the International Crisis Group Gareth Evans, president of the Carnegie Corporation of New York Vartan Gregorian, activist John Prendergast and Academy Award-winning actor and humanitarian George Clooney.

Finalists
 Dr. Tom Catena
 Marguerite Barankitse
 Syeda Ghulam Fatima
 Father Bernard Kinvi

Ceremony
The Aurora Prize for Awakening Humanity inaugural ceremony was held on April 24, 2016, in Yerevan at the Karen Demirchyan Sports and Concerts Complex.

The ceremony was hosted by an Armenian opera diva Hasmik Papian and American journalist and novelist David Ignatius. The ceremony was opened by an animated film directed by Eric Nazarian featuring Serj Tankian's"Aurora's Dream" as the soundtrack. Each of the finalists was introduced with a documentary mini-film directed by Andrey Loshak.

The live music during the ceremony was performed by State Youth Orchestra of Armenia conducted by Sergey Smbatyan. The fanfares of the ceremony was composed by Stepan Shakaryan. The statuette, created by Manvel Matevosyan was presented with an excerpt from Two Suns, a ballet by the Ballet2021 Foundation dance troupe (choreographer Rudolf Kharatyan), accompanied by Avet Terteryan's and Arno Babajanyan's music. The State Youth Orchestra of Armenia performed an excerpt from Aram Khachaturyan's Symphony No. 2 (Bell Symphony). The co-hostess, soprano Hasmik Papian performed Barsegh Kanachyan's "Lullaby". The ceremony was concluded with the song "Pour toi, Arménie" (For you, Armenia) performed by Gevorg Hakobyan and the State Youth Orchestra of Armenia.

Laureate
The inaugural Aurora Prize was awarded to Marguerite Barankitse from Burundi.

Barankitse chose Fondation Jean-Francois Peterbroeck, Foundation du Grand-Duc et de la Grande-Duchesse, Bridderlech Deelen to receive $1 million awards as part of the prize package.

The statuette of the Aurora Prize for Awakening Humanity was created by Manvel Matevosyan and is called Towards Eternity.

2017 Aurora Prize
Selection Committee
The members of Selection Committee of 2017 Aurora Prize are George Clooney (co-chair), Vartan Gregorian, Oscar Arias, Shirin Ebadi, Gareth Evans, Leymah Gbowee, Hina Jilani, Mary Robinson and Ernesto Zedillo.

Finalists
The nominations for 2017 Aurora Prize were opened on June 1 and the finalists were:

 Ms. Fartuun Adan and Ms. Ilwad Elman
 Ms. Jamila Afghani
 Dr. Tom Catena
 Mr. Muhammad Darwish
 Dr. Denis Mukwege

Laureate
The 2017 Aurora Prize for Awakening Humanity was awarded to Dr. Tom Catena.

2018 Aurora Prize 

Selection Committee
The members of Selection Committee of 2018 Aurora Prize are George Clooney (co-chair), Vartan Gregorian, Oscar Arias, Shirin Ebadi, Gareth Evans, Leymah Gbowee, Hina Jilani, Mary Robinson, Ernesto Zedillo, Lord Ara Darzi, Bernard Kouchner and Samantha Power.

Finalists
 Mr. Kyaw Hla Aung (1941-2021)
 Fr. Héctor Tomás González Castillo
 Mrs. Sunitha Krishnan

Laureate
The 2018 Aurora Prize for Awakening Humanity was awarded to Mr. Kyaw Hla Aung.

2019 Aurora Prize 
Selection Committee

The members of Selection Committee of 2019 Aurora Prize are Oscar Arias, Shirin Ebadi, Leymah Gbowee, Mary Robinson, Hina Jilani, Gareth Evans, Ernesto Zedillo, Bernard Kouchner, Samantha Power, John Prendergast, Valery Gergiev, Vartan Gregorian, Lord Ara Darzi (chair), Benjamin Ferencz (honorary co-chair) and George Clooney (honorary co-chair).

Finalists

 Mr. Mirza Dinnayi
 Mr. Zannah Mustapha
 Ms. Huda Al-Sarari

Laureate
The 2019 Aurora Prize for Awakening Humanity was awarded to Mr. Mirza Dinnayi.

2020 Aurora Prize 
Selection Committee

The members of Selection Committee of 2020 Aurora Prize are Shirin Ebadi, Leymah Gbowee, Mary Robinson, Hina Jilani, Ernesto Zedillo, Bernard Kouchner, Samantha Power, Paul Polman, John Prendergast, Vartan Gregorian, Lord Ara Darzi (chair), Benjamin Ferencz (honorary co-chair) and George Clooney (honorary co-chair).

Finalists

 Fartuun Adan and Ilwad Elman
 Angélique Namaika
 Sophie Beau and Klaus Vogel
 Sakena Yacoobi

Laureate
The 2020 Aurora Prize for Awakening Humanity was awarded to Fartuun Adan and Ilwad Elman.

2021 Aurora Prize 
Selection Committee

The members of Selection Committee of 2020 Aurora Prize are Shirin Ebadi, Leymah Gbowee, Mary Robinson, Hina Jilani, Ernesto Zedillo, Bernard Kouchner, Dele Olojede, John Prendergast, Vartan Gregorian, Lord Ara Darzi (chair), Benjamin Ferencz (honorary co-chair) and George Clooney (honorary co-chair).

Finalists
 Grégoire Ahongbonon
 Ruby Alba Castaño
Paul Farmer
 Julienne Lusenge
 Ashwaq Moharram

Laureate

The sixth annual Aurora Prize for Awakening Humanity was awarded to Julienne Lusenge, a human rights defender, co-founder of Women's Solidarity for Inclusive Peace and Development (SOFEPADI) and Fund for Congolese Women (FFC), who has been helping the victims of wartime sexual violence for years.

2022 Aurora Prize 
Finalists

 Jamila Afghani
 Hadi Jumaan
 Mahienour El-Massry
Laureate

The seventh Aurora Prize for Awakening Humanity was awarded to Jamila Afghani, an educator, human rights defender, and founder of the Noor Educational and Capacity Development Organization (NECDO). Jamila has dedicated over 25 years of her life to giving the women of Afghanistan access to education.

References

External links

IDeA (Initiatives for Development of Armenia) charitable foundation
#AraratChallenge
Maison Shalom | Burundi

Humanitarian aid organizations
Armenian awards
International awards
Awards established in 2015